Barry Migliorini (born July 18, 1966), is a former American Basketball Association (2000–present) (ABA) Head Coach for the California Dream.

Career

Business career 
Following college Migliorini was a sports agent who represented MLB player Mike Vento, of the New York Yankees, and NFL football player Ryan Smith of the Carolina Panthers among other professional athletes.

In May 1998 Migliorini was a co-defendant along with Andrew Shoemaker, and Alan C. Greenberg "Ace" in a fraud, churning and unauthorized trading case. Migliorini who held a 24 license was additionally accused of "failure to supervise". In total including attorney fees, interest and punitive damages the plaintiff was seeking over $1,000,000 in relief. The defendants prevailed in its entirety and the case was expunged from Migliorini's CRD record.

In 2002, while working as an Investment Banker with National Capital Migliorini signed a contract with Aethlon Medical (AEMD) valued at $161,537. In November 2014 the stock sky rocked to $26 a share and moved to Nasdaq after AEMD announced its patented Hemopurifier could treat the Ebola virus.

In an 8k filing with the U.S. Securities and Exchange Commission dated September 18, 2015 Migliorini received 6,000 shares of American Housing Income Trust. . At the time American Housing Income Trust (AHIT) traded at $7000 per share giving the contract a total value of $42,002,000. On December 4, 2015, AHIT terminated its Consulting Agreement with Barry Migliorini without requesting any re-numeration. AHIT merged with Corix Bio-science (CXBS) on March 14, 2017 and changed company focus to develop proprietary cannabis and industrial hemp strains. On February 26, 2016 Migliorini spoke at the Alternative Asset conference in Miami as an expert in blockchain technology and Cannabis. For the second consecutive year Barry Migliorini was listed as one of the wealthiest people with ties to Fountain Valley possessing a net worth of $650,000,000

Coaching career

Prior to coaching in the ABA Migliorini was an assistant coach at NCAA Division II California State University, Los Angeles under coach Stephen Thompson (basketball). In 2014 Migliorini was named a top 20 assistant college basketball coach by college sports madness.

Before coaching basketball Migliorini was a high school cross country running and track and field coach at Fountain Valley High School in Fountain Valley California and Buena Park High School. His cross country teams were ranked in the top-25 nationally for five consecutive years, from 2002-2007. In 11 years, he had 60 student-athletes earn college athletic scholarships, and coached four student-athletes to Footlocker All-America honors.  Migliorini was the high school coach of Nicholas Arciniaga who has finished as the top American runner at Boston, Los Angeles, Houston, and Minnesota Marathons. Migliorini was the subject of criticism for his high mileage coaching tactics.

Early years

After prepping at Fountain Valley High School, Migliorini ran cross country and track as a student-athlete at the University of Southern California for coach Larry Knuth.

References

Living people
Place of birth missing (living people)
Basketball coaches from New Jersey
1966 births
American people of Italian descent
People from Greater Los Angeles
Track and field people from California
Cal State Los Angeles Golden Eagles men's basketball coaches